The Palais Hongran is a historic mansion in Nice, Alpes-Maritimes, France. It was built from 1769 to 1772. It has been listed as an official national monument since December 2, 2010.

References

Houses completed in 1772
Monuments historiques of Nice